The third Mujib cabinet was formed on 16 March 1973 after the Bangladesh Awami League won the first general election of sovereign and independent Bangladesh with a vast majority.

Cabinet
The cabinet was composed of the following ministers:

|}

Notes

References

Sheikh Mujibur Rahman ministries
Cabinets established in 1973
Cabinets disestablished in 1975